Maximum segment lifetime or MSL is the time a TCP segment can exist in the internetwork system.  It was defined in 1981 to be .

The specification calls for this value to be used for the "time-wait" interval, the minimum time a system must keep the socket in the  state before designating the socket closed, thus preventing the socket from being re-used before that interval.

Values in various operating systems 

The command that can be used on Solaris systems (prior to v11) to determine the time-wait interval is:

    ndd -get /dev/tcp tcp_time_wait_interval

60000 (60 seconds) is a common value.

On FreeBSD systems this description and value can be checked by the command sysctl:
    sysctl -d net.inet.tcp.msl
    sysctl net.inet.tcp.msl
which gets the result:
    net.inet.tcp.msl: Maximum segment lifetime
    net.inet.tcp.msl: 30000

Linux implements several possible optimizations to shorten the  state through recycling, down to a minimum of 3.5s in recent kernels.

References

Transmission Control Protocol